The following is a list of political parties registered at the Ministry of Interior, Spain, from 1976-2002.

Note that:

 The Ministry does not appear to remove registrations if parties become inactive or are dissolved, and many of the groups no longer exist.
 Some of the groups were actually electoral alliances formed to contest a specific election.
 Some of the groups are regional affiliates or branches of a national party.
 Some of the organizations are actually the youth wings of larger political parties.
 Parties are listed by Spanish name, English name, by city, and in chronological order.
Partido  (Labour Party), Valencia, 1976-10-04
Partit Socialista Valencia-PSOE (Valencian Socialist Party-PSOE), Valencia, 1977-03-03
Unió Democrática del País Valencià (Democratic Union of the Valencian Country), Valencia, 1977-03-03
Partido Social Democráta del País Valenciano (Social Democratic Party of the Valencian Country), Valencia, 1977-03-07
Partido Socialista del País Valenciano (Socialist Party of the Valencian Country), Valencia, 1977-03-21
Unitat Socialista del País Valencià (Socialist Unity of the Valencian Country), Valencia, 1977-08-19
Joventuts Socialistes d'Alliberament Nacional dels Països Catalans (Socialist Youth of National Liberation of the Catalan Countries), Valencia, 1977-10-21
Izquierda Republicana Autonomista (Autonomist Republican Left), Valencia, 1977-12-26
Partit Socialista Unificat del País Valencià (Unified Socialist Party of the Valencian Country), Mislata, 1978-01-10
Esquerra Nacionalista Valenciana - URV (Valencian Nationalist Left – URV), Valencia, 1978-01-23
Partit Nacionalista del País Valencià (Nationalist Party of the Valencian Country), Valencia, 1978-09-26
Partit Liberal del País Valencià (Liberal Party of the Valencian Country), Torrent, 1979-07-17
Partido de Unión Republicana Autonomista (Autonomist Republican Union Party), Valencia, 1980-10-27
Unió Valenciana (Valencian Union), Valencia, 1982-08-30
Agrupament d'Esquerra del País Valencià (Left Grouping of the Valencian Country),  Valencia, 1982-10-21
Organización Independiente Valenciana, Oliva, 1983-03-18
Unitat del Poble Valencia o Nacionalistes Valencians, Valencia, 1984-12-03
Partido Comunista del País Valenciano Marxista Revolucionario (Communist Party of the Valencian Country, Marxist-Revolutionary), Valencia, 1985-10-10
Alianza Democrática (Democratic Alliance), Valencia, 1985-10-21
Unidad Independiente del Pueblo, Puebla de San Miguel, 1986-10-31
Partit Comunista del País Valencià (Communist Party of the Valencian Country), Valencia, 1986-11-13
Partido Coalición Valenciana (Valencian Coalition Party), Valencia, 1986-11-19
Convergència Valenciana, Burjassot, 1986-12-19
Agrupación Independiente Valenciana (Independent Group of Valencia), Valencia, 1987-03-13
Partido Popular Valenciano (Popular Party of Valencia), Valencia, 1987-03-13
Agrupación Independiente de la Pobla de Farnals (Independent Group of La Pobla de Farnals), La Pobla de Farnals, 1987-04-14

Valencia
Political parties Valencia